Pipapillomavirus is a genus of viruses, in the family Papillomaviridae. Hamsters serve as natural hosts. There are two species in this genus. Diseases associated with this genus include: cutaneous lesions.

Taxonomy
The following two species are assigned to the genus:
 Pipapillomavirus 1
 Pipapillomavirus 2

Structure
Viruses in Pipapillomavirus are non-enveloped, with icosahedral geometries, and T=7 symmetry. The diameter is around 52-55 nm. Genomes are circular. The genome has 22 open reading frames.

Life cycle
Viral replication is nuclear. Entry into the host cell is achieved by attachment of the viral proteins to host receptors, which mediates endocytosis. Replication follows the dsDNA bidirectional replication model. DNA-templated transcription, with some alternative splicing mechanism is the method of transcription. The virus exits the host cell by nuclear envelope breakdown.
Hamsters serve as the natural host. Transmission routes are contact.

References

External links
 ICTV Report Papillomaviridae
 Viralzone: Pipapillomavirus

Papillomavirus
Virus genera